Ronnie is a given name. It can be a pet form of the masculine name Ronald and the feminine name Veronica.

The masculine Ronald is derived from the Old Norse Rögnvaldr, which is composed of the elements regin ("advice", "decision") and valdr ("ruler"). The feminine Veronica is derived from a form of Berenice, which is derived from the Greek Berenikē, which is in turn derived from the Greek Pherenīkē. The latter Greek name is composed of elements to mean "victory bringer".

People

Female

Ronni Reis (born 1966), American tennis player
Ronnie Edwards (politician) (1952–2016), American politician
Ronnie Spector (1943–2022), American rock and pop singer, lead vocalist of the Ronettes; former wife of Phil Spector

Male
Ronnie Barker (1929–2005), English actor, comedian and writer
Ronnie Baxter (born 1961), English darts player
Ronnie Bell (American football) (born 2000), American football player
Ronnie Biggs (1929–2013), English thief
Ronnie Bryan (1898–1970), English cricketer and soldier 
Ronnie Bucknum (1936–1992), American race car driver
Ronnie Bunting (1947/1948–1980), Protestant Irish republican and socialist activist
Ronnie Burgess (1963–2021), American football player
Ronnie Burns (disambiguation), multiple people
Ronnie Corbett (1930–2016), Scottish stand-up comedian, actor, writer and broadcaster
Ronnie de Mel, Sri Lanka Minister of Finance from 1977-1988
Ronnie DeVoe (born 1967), American singer
Ronnie James Dio (1942–2010), American singer-songwriter and composer
Ronnie Dove (born 1935), American pop and country singer
Ronnie Dunn (born 1953), American singer-songwriter, record executive and member of the country music duo Brooks & Dunn
Ronnie Eckstine (born 1943), American actor
Ronnie Harrell (born 1996), American basketball player for Hapoel Gilboa Galil of the Israeli Basketball Premier League
Ronnie Harrison (born 1997), American football player
Ronnie Hawkins (born 1935), American rockabilly musician
Ronnie Henry (born 1984), English footballer
Ronnie Hickman (born 2001), American football player
Ronnie Lane (1946–1997), English musician, songwriter and producer
Ronnie Laws (born 1950),  American jazz, rhythm and blues and funk saxophonist
Ronnie Leitch (1953–2018), Sri Lankan Burgher actor, vocalist, and comedian
Ronnie Lott (born 1959), American football player
Ronnie McCoury (born 1967), American mandolin player, singer and songwriter
Ronnie McKinnon (born 1940), Scottish footballer 
Ronnie Milsap (born 1943), American country music singer and pianist
Ronnie Moore (born 1953), English former football player and manager
Ronnie Morris (footballer) (born 1970), English former professional footballer
Ronnie Morris (rugby union) (1913–1983), Welsh rugby union player
Ronnie O'Sullivan (born 1975), English snooker player
Ronnie Ortiz-Magro (born 1985), American actor, part of the cast of the reality TV series Jersey Shore
Ronnie Perkins (born 1999), American football player
Ronnie Peterson (1944–1977), Swedish race car driver
Ronnie Price (born 1983), professional basketball player
Ronnie Quintarelli (born 1979), Italian racing driver
Ronnie Radke (born 1983), American musician, songwriter, producer and rapper
Ronnie Ray (born 1954), American sprinter
Ronnie Robinson (roller derby) (1939–2001), American roller derby skater and coach and member of the Roller Derby Hall of Fame
Ronnie Scott (1927–1996), English jazz saxophonist and jazz club owner
Ronnie Schell (1931–2017), American actor and comedian
Ronnie Scribner (born 1966), American former actor
Ronnie Simpson (1930–2004), Scottish football goalkeeper
Ronnie Stern (born 1967), Canadian ice hockey player
Ronnie Thomas (born 1955), American retired race car driver
Ronnie Turner (1911-unknown), Rhodesian international lawn bowler
Ronnie Van Zant (1948–1977), American vocalist, lyricist and a founding member of the Southern rock band Lynyrd Skynyrd
Ronnie Whelan Sr. (1936–1993), Irish footballer
Ronnie Williams (1939–1997), Welsh actor and comedian
Ronnie Wood (born 1947), English rock musician, songwriter and singer best known as a member of the Rolling Stones

Fictional characters

Female
 Ronnie Clayton, from the ITV soap opera Coronation Street
 Veronica Lodge, a main character from the Archie Comics
 Ronnie Mitchell, from the BBC soap opera EastEnders
 Veronica "Ronny" Robinson, the yellow ranger in Power Rangers Operation Overdrive
 Ronnie Anne Santiago, from the Nickelodeon show The Loud House

Male
 Ronnie Bailey, from the ITV soap opera Coronation Street
 Ronnie Dobbs, lead character of the film Run Ronnie Run also featured in various sketches on the HBO sketch comedy series Mr Show
 Ronnie Pilgrim, protagonist of the Jethro Tull album A Passion Play
 Ronnie Woodson, from the BBC soap opera Doctors
 Ronnie, a semi-recurring character in the BBC sitcom One Foot in the Grave

See also
 Ronny
 Roni (disambiguation)

References

English masculine given names
English feminine given names
English-language unisex given names
Hypocorisms